Andrew Lyons (born 19 October 1966) is an English former professional footballer who played as a midfielder. He played in the Football League for Crewe Alexandra and Wigan Athletic, and in the Scottish Football League for Partick Thistle and Ayr United. He later became a coach at Blackpool F.C.'s Centre of Excellence.

Career

Playing career
Lyons started his career at Northern Premier League club Fleetwood Town in 1991. On 26 October 1992 he signed for Football League Third Division club Crewe Alexandra for a fee of £15,000. He then moved to fellow Third Division club Wigan Athletic on 1 October 1993.

Lyons moved to Scotland on 1 March 1996 to play for Scottish Premier Division club Partick Thistle for a transfer fee of £35,000. However, they were relegated at the end of the season to the First Division. He left the club at the end of the 1997–98 season when they were relegated to the Second Division. He then signed for First Division club Ayr United. He left Ayr at the end of the 1999–2000 season. He then returned to England, by which time he was playing semi-professionally while working as a postman, and signed for Football Conference club Morecambe where he spent the 2000–01 season.

In August 2001 he moved to local rivals Lancaster City in the Northern Premier League First Division.

Masters Football
On 30 June 2007 Lyons played for Wigan Athletic Masters Football team in the 2007 North West Masters competition at the M.E.N. Arena in Manchester. He scored one goal in a 5–1 win over Bolton Wanderers as Wigan reached the final where they lost 2–1 to Manchester United. He also played for Wigan at the 2008 Mersey Masters at the Liverpool Echo Arena on 28 June 2008.

Coaching career
Lyons is now a fully qualified coach, having obtained the UEFA B coaching licence. He is currently the coach of the Under-14's team at Fleetwood Town Football Club's Academy.

References

External links

Living people
1966 births
English footballers
Sportspeople from Blackpool
Fleetwood Town F.C. players
Crewe Alexandra F.C. players
Morecambe F.C. players
Scottish Football League players
Wigan Athletic F.C. players
Partick Thistle F.C. players
Ayr United F.C. players
Lancaster City F.C. players
Blackpool F.C. non-playing staff
English Football League players
Association football midfielders